Sam Dickson (born 28 October 1989) is a New Zealand rugby sevens player.

Biography 
Dickson was educated at St Thomas of Canterbury College, Christchurch. He was a member of the New Zealand national Australian rules football team during the 2011 Australian Football International Cup.

Dickson was selected as a member of the New Zealand sevens team to the 2016 Summer Olympics.

Dickson was part of the 2014 Commonwealth Games squad. He is of Māori descent, and affiliates to the Ngāi Tahu iwi. He won a bronze medal with the All Blacks Sevens team at the 2022 Commonwealth Games in Birmingham. He co-captained the team at the Rugby World Cup Sevens in Cape Town. He won a silver medal after his side lost to Fiji in the gold medal final.

References

External links 
 
 
 
 

Living people
New Zealand international rugby sevens players
Rugby sevens players at the 2016 Summer Olympics
Olympic rugby sevens players of New Zealand
1989 births
Commonwealth Games rugby sevens players of New Zealand
Rugby sevens players at the 2014 Commonwealth Games
New Zealand male rugby sevens players
Ngāi Tahu people
New Zealand Māori rugby union players
Commonwealth Games medallists in rugby sevens
Commonwealth Games silver medallists for New Zealand
Rugby sevens players at the 2018 Commonwealth Games
Commonwealth Games gold medallists for New Zealand
People educated at St Thomas of Canterbury College
New Zealand rugby union players
Rugby union flankers
Rugby union number eights
Otago rugby union players
Bay of Plenty rugby union players
Canterbury rugby union players
Rugby sevens players at the 2022 Commonwealth Games
Medallists at the 2014 Commonwealth Games
Medallists at the 2018 Commonwealth Games
Medallists at the 2022 Commonwealth Games